Alexander Laing (1787–1857) was a Scottish verse writer, known as the Brechin poet.

Life
Laing was born at Brechin, Angus, 14 May 1787; his father was an agricultural labourer. Laing spent only two winters at school, and when eight years old became a herdsman. At the age 16 he was apprenticed to a flax-dresser, and followed this occupation for fourteen years, when an accident permanently disabled him.

Laing afterwards earned a living as a pedlar, and died at Brechin, 14 October 1857.

Works
Laing wrote in Lallans, and contributed to local newspapers and to the following poetical miscellanies:

The Harp of Renfrewshire, 1819; 
John Struthers's The Harp of Caledonia, 1819; 
Robert Archibald Smith's The Scotish [sic.] Minstrel, 1820; 
Alexander Whitelaw's Book of Scottish Song, 1844; and 
Whistle Binkie, 1832–47.

Laing also furnished anecdotes to the Scottish story-book The Laird of Logan, 1835. In 1846 he published a collection of his poetry under the title Wayside Flowers, of which a second edition appeared in 1850. He edited popular editions of Robert Burns and Robert Tannahill, supplied notes to Allan Cunningham's Scottish Songs, 1825, and biographical notices to the Angus Album, 1833.

Notes

Attribution

1787 births
1857 deaths
Scottish poets
People from Brechin
Lallans poets